Dobriany may refer to the following places in the Lviv Oblast of Ukraine:

 Dobriany, Horodok Raion
 Dobriany, Mykolaiv Raion
 Dobriany, Stryi Raion